The Alau Dam is situated in the Alau community of Konduga local government area of Borno State in the Northeast region of Nigeria, constructed in 1984–1986. It impounds a major reservoir on the Ngadda River, one of the tributaries of the Lake Chad.

References

Dams in Nigeria
Lake Chad
1986 establishments in Nigeria